Burgholtshouse, or Burgholts House, is a historic home located at Lower Windsor Township, York County, Pennsylvania. It was built about 1820, and is a large -story, Georgian-style stone dwelling.  It is five bays wide and has a gable roof.  It features a second story front porch.

It was added to the National Register of Historic Places in 1979.

References

Houses on the National Register of Historic Places in Pennsylvania
Georgian architecture in Pennsylvania
Houses completed in 1820
Houses in York County, Pennsylvania
National Register of Historic Places in York County, Pennsylvania